Susan Linn is an American writer, psychologist, and ventriloquist. She is the founder of Campaign for a Commercial-Free Childhood and author of the book Consuming Kids. She is a research associate at Boston Children's Hospital and a lecturer at Harvard Medical School.

Early life and education

Linn graduated from Harvard University with a degree in Education and Counseling Psychology.

Career

Linn is a ventriloquist who has performed in various locations, including Puppet Showplace Theater. She also performed on Mister Rogers' Neighborhood. Her characters included Audrey Duck, Cat-a-lion, and Timberlane Wolf.

Linn became a puppet therapist at Boston Children's Hospital.

Linn is the founder of the Campaign for a Commercial-Free Childhood, a non-profit organization dedicated to protecting children from deceptive advertising. She worked for the organization from its founding in 2000 through 2015 when she left to focus on writing and teaching. Linn also appeared in The Greatest Movie Ever Sold, a 2011 documentary about marketing and advertising.

References

External links 
 Consuming Kids website
 Susan Linn at Internet Movie Database

Living people
Year of birth missing (living people)
Harvard University alumni
21st-century American psychologists
Harvard Medical School people